Yahor Lapo (born June 20, 1982 in Minsk) is a modern pentathlete from Belarus. At the 2008 Summer Olympics, he competed in the men's event, along with his compatriot Dzmitry Meliakh. During the competition, he finished in penultimate place, out of thirty-six competitors.

Lapo also won an individual bronze medal at the 2008 World Modern Pentathlon Championships in Budapest, Hungary.

References

External links
 

Belarusian male modern pentathletes
1982 births
Living people
Olympic modern pentathletes of Belarus
Modern pentathletes at the 2008 Summer Olympics
Sportspeople from Minsk
World Modern Pentathlon Championships medalists